The Peking Gazette was an official bulletin published with changing frequency in Beijing until 1912, when the Qing dynasty fell and Republican China was born. The translated name, as it is known to Western sources, comes from Ming dynasty-era Jesuits, who followed the bulletin for its political contents. The Peking Gazette became a venue for political grievances and infighting during the reign of the Wanli Emperor in the late Ming dynasty, when literati factions would submit politicized memorials that the Emperor often abstained from reviewing. From around 1730, the publication was in Chinese called Jing Bao (京报, sometimes transliterated Ching Pao), literally "the Capital Report". It contained information on court appointments, edicts, and the official memorials submitted to the emperor, and the decisions made or deferred.

Author J.C. Sun in his book Modern Chinese Press, published in 1946, said the Gazette seemed to have been

Publication type 
Contrary to a sometimes voiced belief, the Peking Gazette was not a newspaper, but a government bulletin, although it might be considered a distant precursor:

See also 
Tipao
Kaiyuan Za Bao
History of Chinese newspapers
List of the earliest newspapers

References

External links 
English translations from the Peking Gazette from the 1870s

Newspapers published in Beijing
Qing dynasty literature
Publications disestablished in 1912
Defunct newspapers published in China
Government gazettes